79th meridian may refer to:

79th meridian east, a line of longitude east of the Greenwich Meridian
79th meridian west, a line of longitude west of the Greenwich Meridian